Tommy Kind (born 2 March 1992) is a German footballer who plays as a centre-back for SpVgg Erlangen.

Career
Kind made his professional debut for Rot-Weiß Erfurt in the 3. Liga on 3 November 2012, coming on as a substitute in the 90th minute for Nils Pfingsten-Reddig in the 2–3 away loss against Preußen Münster.

References

External links
 
 
 Tommy Kind at FuPa.net 

1992 births
Living people
German footballers
Association football central defenders
FC Rot-Weiß Erfurt players
3. Liga players